The 2017 national cyclo-cross championships were held from September through to January and are organised by the UCI member federations. They began in Australia in September 2016.

National champions

The winner of each national championship wears the national jersey in all their races for the next year in the respective discipline, apart from the World Championships and the Olympics, or unless they are wearing a category leader's jersey in a stage race. Most national champion jerseys tend to represent a country's flag or use the colours from it. Jerseys may also feature traditional sporting colours of a country that are not derived from a national flag, such as the green and gold on the jerseys of Australian national champions.

Continental champions

References

National cyclo-cross championships
2017 in cyclo-cross